Shin Young-sun (born 30 October 1969) is a South Korean biathlete. He competed in the 20 km individual event at the 1988 Winter Olympics.

References

1969 births
Living people
South Korean male biathletes
Olympic biathletes of South Korea
Biathletes at the 1988 Winter Olympics
Place of birth missing (living people)
Asian Games medalists in biathlon
Biathletes at the 1990 Asian Winter Games
Asian Games bronze medalists for South Korea
Medalists at the 1990 Asian Winter Games
20th-century South Korean people
21st-century South Korean people